There are at least 13 named trails in Carbon County, Wyoming according to the U.S. Geological Survey, Board of Geographic Names.  A trail is defined as: "Route for passage from one point to another; does not include roads or highways (jeep trail, path, ski trail)."

 Arlington Pack Trail, el.  
 Custer National Forest Trail, el.  
 Elkhorn Stock Driveway, el.  
 Emigrant Trail, el.  
 Fireline Trail, el.  
 Green Ridge Trail, el.  
 Main Fork Trail, el.  
 Medicine Bow Trail, el.  
 Sandstone Divide Trail, el.  
 State Line Trail (Wyoming), el.  
 State Line Trail (Wyoming), el.  
 Troublesome Trail, el.

See also
 List of trails in Wyoming

Notes

Geography of Carbon County, Wyoming
Historic trails and roads in Wyoming